Protein Wisdom may refer to:

 Protein Wisdom (blog) – a conservative-libertarian weblog created by Jeff Goldstein
 "Protein Wisdom" – a low-protein diet advocated by the London eccentric Stanley Owen Green
 Protein WISDOM – a software tool for protein design